Béla Mikla (born 1921, date of death unknown) was a Hungarian fencer. He competed in the individual and team épée events at the 1948 Summer Olympics.

References

External links
 

1921 births
Year of death missing
Hungarian male épée fencers
Olympic fencers of Hungary
Fencers at the 1948 Summer Olympics
Martial artists from Budapest